Glenview, also known as Chambliss House, is a historic home located near Stony Creek, Sussex County, Virginia.  The original section of the house was built about 1800, and subsequently enlarged and modified in the 1820s.  It is a two-story, hip-roofed, five bay dwelling.  It has a Georgian central-hall plan with Federal style design influences. Also on the property are a contributing early-19th century frame secondary structure that was likely used as a store and dwelling and the Chambliss family burial ground.

It was listed on the National Register of Historic Places in 2008.

References

Houses on the National Register of Historic Places in Virginia
Georgian architecture in Virginia
Federal architecture in Virginia
Houses completed in 1800
National Register of Historic Places in Sussex County, Virginia
Houses in Sussex County, Virginia